Andrew Gill may refer to:
 Andrew Gill (diver), British diver
Andrew Gill (coach) ( 1887–1947), head football and basketball coach at the University of Kentucky
Andrew Gill, Canadian Liberal Party candidate for Ontario

See also
Andy Gill (1956–2020), founding member and guitarist for the English rock group Gang of Four